Armando Federico Renganeschi, or simply Renganeschi (10 May 1913 in Capitán Sarmiento, Buenos Aires – 12 October 1983 in Campinas) was an Argentine football centre back.

Renganeschi was also the manager of Brazilian club Guarani Futebol Clube during the 1971 Campeonato Paulista.

References

External links
Renganeschi: E-zagueiro do São Paulo e ex-treinador at Portal Terceiro Tempo

1913 births
1983 deaths
Argentine footballers
Argentine expatriate footballers
Argentine football managers
Expatriate footballers in Brazil
Fluminense FC players
Sociedade Esportiva Palmeiras players
Associação Ferroviária de Esportes managers
São Paulo FC managers
Sociedade Esportiva Palmeiras managers
Guarani FC managers
CR Flamengo managers
Associação Atlética Portuguesa (Santos) managers
Associação Atlética Ponte Preta managers
Londrina Esporte Clube managers
Sport Club Corinthians Paulista managers
Esporte Clube Bahia managers
Campeonato Brasileiro Série A managers
Association football defenders
Sportspeople from Buenos Aires Province